Musical Fidelity is a British producer of high-end audio equipment focusing on streaming music players, and its core product range of amplifiers of various types (power, phono, headphone, integrated and pre-amplifiers).  Other products have included headphones, Digital-Analog Converters (DACs), CD players, Bluetooth Receivers, ‘all-in-one systems’ (including Phono turntable). Founded in the United Kingdom in 1982, they are known for their unusual industrial design, Nuvistor tube use and Class-AB amplifiers.

History 
Musical Fidelity was founded in 1982 by Antony Michaelson, a clarinettist and Hi-Fi enthusiast, following his exit from Michaelson & Austin, a predecessor company of which he was a partner.

Musical Fidelity's first product was "The Preamp", which incorporated moving coil and moving magnet pre-amplification and a single line-level ‘Tuner’ input. This was originally designed to overcome his dissatisfaction with the Michaelson & Austin TVP-1 pre- amplifier. The first batch of “The Preamp” were made on Michaelson's home kitchen table and sold out almost at once through a local dealer. The dealer asked for more product, which resulted in Michaelson making the decision to go into full-time production.

This was followed by the ‘Dr Thomas’ power amplifier, designed by Dr Martin Vaughan Thomas, capable of outputting 100-plus watts. Later products included the Preamp II, and the Typhoon Power amplifier.

From there, Michaelson commissioned a seemingly endless variety and range of new products using a wide variety of circuit concepts and technologies. Many of these became significant Hi-Fi milestones.

Significant products 
Musical Fidelity is probably best known for its A1 integrated amplifier, a Class A amplifier, rated at 25W per channel these run very hot but produced, according to the manufacturer, a very sweet, authentic sound, reminiscent of tube amplifiers. This was launched in 1985 and sold over 100,000 units over its lifetime.

In 1986, the A370 power amplifier was launched – at that time unusual (in the UK) for being a rack-mountable domestic amplifier. It produced 185 Watts per channel.  These were the first of their type to be made by a UK Hi-Fi company.  Then followed a range of well received loudspeakers, the MC series (designed by Martin Colloms) and the Reference series, featuring 'TPX' polypropylene drivers.

A year later, the Digilog was launched, one of the first stand-alone production DACs.

In the late 1980s Musical Fidelity introduced further amplifiers, including the P170 and high-powered rack mount style amplifiers, including the P270, A370 (all featuring Hitachi lateral MOSFETs) and the SA470, SA570. In the early nineties, Musical Fidelity released the P180, with CRPS (Choke Regulated Power Supply). This was possibly the first time bifilar wound coils had been combined with transistor electronics. This design innovation helped suppress electro-magnetic radiation frequencies (EMF), reducing the amount of potential noise interference into the audio circuits .

In 1992, the A1000 was launched – one of the first 'super integrated' amplifiers, with a full range of line level inputs coupled to a Class A power amplifier section producing 50W / channel into 8 ohms.  Initially it was only made for Japan but later was well received around the world.

The X series was launched in 1997 consisting of a range of cute extruded cylindrical add-on components, which later spawned the XA series.  The units consisted of various amplifiers, Digital-to-analogue converters, Phono stages, tuners and CD players and ancillary power supplies.

The NuVista preamp was introduced in 1997, the first modern, mass-produced audio product using Nuvistor tubes, which were miniature metal-ceramic enclosed vacuum tubes manufactured by RCA .  These were followed by power and integrated amplifiers, with ancillary power supplies. Numerous products have descended from it, such as the Tri-Vista 21 ‘Super DAC’, introduced in 2002, culminating in the latest being the NuVista 800.

The kW Pre- and Power Amp was introduced in 2003. The power amplifier was then the highest power audiophile-grade power amp ever made commercially by a UK audiophile company, producing 1 kW of power per channel into 8 ohms. Notably, two mono-blocs and their power supply weighed in at 129 kG.   It was followed by the Titan, an upgrade from the kW.

In 2015, the Merlin was released, a multi-format music system that came with a turntable, wireless streaming and a pair of unique speakers, allowing users to play vinyl records and stream digital music over high quality apt-X Bluetooth, in a very compact form factor.

As of 2018 , the products consist of the Nu-Vista, M8, M6, M5si, M3, MX, LX2, and V90 Series as well as the Encore Streaming Music servers. Most of the series provide a mix of Phono stages, integrated amplifiers, DACs, CD players and Headphone amplifiers. The Nu-Vista series continues in the tradition of using a mix of Nuvistor tubes, transistors and Digital technology.

Musical fidelity CDs 
Michaelson was a professional clarinettist and on the Musical Fidelity label recorded a number of CDs of major works for the clarinet .

2004 Musical Fidelity CD - Mozart Clarinet Concerto K622 In A Major. Antony Michaelson, Michelangelo Chamber Orchestra, Leader Adrian Levine, Conducted by Robert Bailey

2002 Musical Fidelity CD -  Mozart and Brahms Clarinet Quintets. Antony Michaelson, Adrian Levine, Kathy Andrew, Stephen Tees, Judith Serkin

2001 Musical Fidelity CD - Mozart And Brahms Clarinet Trios. Antony Michaelson, Stephen Tees, Andrea Hess, Ingrid Jacoby

2001 Musical Fidelity CD – Brahms Clarinet Sonatas. Antony Michaelson, Ingrid Jacoby

1999 Musical Fidelity CD - Weber Clarinet Quintet / Bärmann 3rd Clarinet Quintet . Antony Michaelson, Beverley Davison, Elizabeth Layton, Roger Chase, Jonathan Williams

1994 Musical Fidelity CD- Mozart Clarinet Quintet, Antony Michaelson, Adrian Levine, Colin Callow, Jeremy Williams, Robert Bailey

Sonic characteristics of Musical Fidelity products 
Michaelson stressed that his most important design aim was accuracy and truthfulness to the music. Despite this, Musical Fidelity products generally displayed a sweet, easy going sound quality. Although most reviews identified this quality with MF's products, some did not approve of it.

Michaelson thought that for best results, Hi-Fi should not need much set-up and tweaking. He strongly disapproved of what he called 'cable madness'. His refusal to accept the prevailing zeitgeist of cable worship frequently landed him in disputes with a variety of Hi-Fi luminaries. He relished the disagreements. Over time, his view has been borne out by the waning of the market for high-end interconnect and speaker cables sold at very high prices.

Change of ownership 
In 2017, Michaelson decided to retire. A search was conducted for a suitable partner to take over the brand name and continue with the heritage. Eventually he came to an agreement with Heinz Lichtenegger of Audio Tuning (also the owner of Pro-ject) and on 14 May 2018 they took over the brand and its intellectual property.

Product range timeline

1980s 
The Preamp
The Preamp 2
Dr. Thomas power amplifier
Synthesis Integrated
3a/3b pre-amp
MVT
MVX
Studio T
A1 series
A100 series
B200 series
P140(x)
P150(x)
P170
P270
P180
A370
A470
Digilog
B1 series
MC loudspeaker series
Reference loudspeaker series

1990s 
A1000
F series
Elektra series
X series
XA series
NuVista series
Michaelson Audio series

2000s 
A3 series
A5 series
A308 series
kW series
TriVista series
Kelly Transducers
M1 turntable
V series
Titan

2010s 
M1 series
M3 series
M5 series
M6 series
Quarkie headphones
Musical Fidelity EB and MF headphone series
Merlin
Round Table turntable
V90 series
MX series
LX series
NuVista series

See also
 List of phonograph manufacturers

References

External links
http://www.musicalfidelity.com/

Audio amplifier manufacturers
Compact Disc player manufacturers
Manufacturing companies established in 1982
Audio equipment manufacturers of the United Kingdom
Manufacturing companies based in London
Headphone amplifier manufacturers
Phonograph manufacturers
1982 establishments in the United Kingdom